Michael Zezima (known as Mickey Z) is a writer, editor, blogger and novelist living in New York City.  He writes a bimonthly column, "Mickey Z. Says", for VegNews magazine and he has also appeared on the C-SPAN network's Book TV program.  He is also a regular contributor to Planet Green, ZNet, CounterPunch, OpEdNews, Animal Liberation Front, and other websites.

Biography
Mickey Z. was born and raised in Astoria, Queens, has appeared in a book with Noam Chomsky, and in a martial arts film with Billy Blanks.  With only a high school diploma, he has authored 12 books and has "spoken and lectured in venues ranging from MIT to ABC No Rio, from Yale University to Occupy Free University.  Howard Zinn called him 'provocative and bold.'"

Michael Zezima adopted the name Mickey Z after working at a gym in New York City where a friend called him Mickey.  He liked the sound of it and used it in his pen name.

He currently hosts Post-Woke Podcast on his Substack.

Bibliography
 
 
 
 
 
 
 
 
 
 
 Mickey Z (2014). Occupy this Book. Sullivan Street Press. . Retrieved 2016-04-26 
 Mickey Z (2015). Occupy These Photos. Sullivan Street Press. .

References

External links
 Mickey Z's blog
 A tiny bio
 Radical America’s Homeboy: Mickey Z (Mickey is interviewed by Maxwell Black)
 

Living people
American male bloggers
American bloggers
American political writers
American male writers
Writers from New York City
21st-century American non-fiction writers
Year of birth missing (living people)